Martin Shanahan (born 1973) is an Irish public servant.  He has been CEO of IDA Ireland since 2014.

Early life
Shanahan was born in Abbeydorney, County Kerry.

He holds a H.Dip (Higher Diploma in Hotel and Catering Management), and an M.Sc., from Dublin Institute of Technology, as well as a B.Sc. (Mgmt.) and M.A. (1994) from Trinity College Dublin, and an M.Res (Master of Educational Research) from Lancaster University.

Career

Early career
Shanahan's early experience was in the hotel industry and Irish public sector roles including Fáilte Ireland, the Irish tourism promotion and development authority, and CERT (a State tourism training body).  According to his resume, Shanahan worked in some private Irish hotels (e.g. Sinnott Hotels).

Shanahan worked from 2005 to 2014 in Forfás, an Irish state-funded policy agency which advised government on enterprise, trade, science, technology, and innovation, with a staff of 90.  Shanahan worked in a number of Forfás roles before becoming head of the policy unit in 2010.  Forfas was dissolved in 2014, as part of the then Government's commitment to reducing the number of Irish State quangos, and its functions were transferred to the Department of Jobs, Enterprise and Innovation, Enterprise Ireland, the Industrial Development Authority and the Health and Safety Authority.

IDA Ireland
Shanahan took up the position of CEO of IDA Ireland on 1 September 2014.  The role was described by journalist Colm Kelpie as "part politician, part diplomat, and part salesman".  Shanahan has highlighted the availability of talent above all, and satisfaction with the quality of the country's third-level education system as reasons why Ireland has been so popular with multinational companies.

Brexit
The first major event to occur during Shanahan's tenure as IDA CEO was Brexit.  Shanahan was quoted as saying Brexit was likely to be a net positive for IDA Ireland in terms of attracting companies (both UK and non-UK) to Ireland as a base for selling into the EU.   In June 2017 Shanahan was criticized for filling only one of ten positions that his office had been given to hire people to attract companies to Ireland that were leaving the UK due to Brexit.

In October 2017, and again in January 2018, Shanahan testified before the Public Accounts Committee that Ireland needed to improve the affordability of its housing and its infrastructure, particularly broadband internet access, to remain competitive in attracting foreign companies; he also said that while companies in the financial industry were considering moving from the UK to Ireland due to Brexit, the loss of access to the UK for companies that depend on it for sales or supplies could harm Irish companies.

As of December 2017, several major financial firms based in the UK had chosen to go to Frankfurt, Luxembourg, Brussels, or Paris, and in January 2018 Shanahan reported that no new jobs had been created in Ireland due to Brexit and that he expected to see the outcome of his office's efforts at the end of 2018 or the beginning of 2019.  By June 2018 companies opting to go elsewhere had caused Ireland to fall out of the top 10 rankings for European financial firms.

US corporate tax changes
The second major event was the Tax Cuts and Jobs Act of 2017 (or TCJA) which changes the tax structure for U.S. multinationals in Ireland. Shanahan was confident about the TCJA noting Ireland's headline corporate tax rate of 12.5% was competitive against the new headline U.S. corporate tax rate of 21%.

Other items
In November 2014, Shanahan was interviewed on CNBC's Squawk Box live in the CNBC studio.  During the interview, long-standing CNBC presenter Joe Kernen asked unusual questions including: "Do tax breaks lead to better golfers?" "Is Ireland really in the euro?" "Is it not just part of Britain?" and "Is it actually its own island?".  The unusual interview received international coverage

During the Irish Same-sex marriage referendum in 2015, Shanahan stated that a 'Yes' vote would be in the State's economic interest and that a 'No' vote would send a negative message to the international business community (Ireland's largest company is Apple).  His interview drew praise and criticism with some questioning if he had over-stepped his position, as Shanahan himself is gay.

Wikipedia
In April 2019, Shanahan's page was involved in a controversy relating to the alleged editing of Wikipedia pages by paid editors following allegations by Web Summit founder Paddy Cosgrave. Various pages were claimed to have been impact, including those relating to Shanahan, the Irish economy and taxation system and others. Many of these pages had been established or mainly contributed to by a Wikipedia user named Britishfinance.

Personal life
As of last report, Shanahan lives in Skerries, in Fingal, north of Dublin, with his partner, Gary. He is a prominent member of the LGBT community and LGBT in business.  He was ranked #11 in the Financial Times OUTstanding Lists for LGBT Public Sector executives.

References 

1973 births
People from County Kerry
Alumni of Dublin Institute of Technology
Alumni of Trinity College Dublin
Alumni of Lancaster University
People from Fingal
Irish businesspeople
Irish chief executives
Irish gay men
Irish LGBT businesspeople
Gay businessmen
Living people